The Huntsman World Senior Games is the largest annual multi-sport senior competition in the world (Most participants are U.S. citizens, but athletes from Canada, Australia, Russia, Japan and several other countries also participate).

The Games was founded in 1987 as a not-for-profit 501(c)(3) organization,

All athletes aged 50 and over, of all skill levels, are eligible to compete.

No pre-qualification is necessary.

In addition to self-registered entries, invitation-only tournaments are also included, such as the Global Cup World Senior Volleyball Championships.

In 2018, 11,033 athletes from around the world participated.

This participation level is comparable to the number of athletes at the 2016 Summer Olympics in Rio de Janeiro.

Team sports included 349 softball teams and 213 volleyball teams that year.

Following the tradition of the Olympic Games, opening ceremonies are held at Greater Zion Stadium at Utah Tech University in St. George, Utah, and feature a parade of athletes and a fireworks display.

Singing and dancing performances at the opening ceremonies are provided by the performing arts studio Diamond Talent.

In many events, results from the competition serve to qualify for the bi-annual National Senior Games,

and may be submitted for World Record consideration.

The 2020 competition was cancelled due to the COVID-19 pandemic.

Summary
In 1989 Jon M. Huntsman, became the Games' sponsor.

 1987 World Senior Games
 1988 World Senior Games
 1989 Huntsman World Senior Games
 1990 Huntsman World Senior Games
 1991 Huntsman World Senior Games
 1992 Huntsman World Senior Games
 1993 Huntsman World Senior Games
 1994 Huntsman World Senior Games
 1995 Huntsman World Senior Games
 1996 Huntsman World Senior Games
 1997 Huntsman World Senior Games
 1998 Huntsman World Senior Games
 1999 Huntsman World Senior Games
 2000 Huntsman World Senior Games
 2001 Huntsman World Senior Games
 2002 Huntsman World Senior Games
 2003 Huntsman World Senior Games
 2004 Huntsman World Senior Games
 2005 Huntsman World Senior Games
 2006 Huntsman World Senior Games
 2007 Huntsman World Senior Games
 2008 Huntsman World Senior Games
 2009 Huntsman World Senior Games
 2010 Huntsman World Senior Games
 2011 Huntsman World Senior Games
 2012 Huntsman World Senior Games
 2013 Huntsman World Senior Games
 2014 Huntsman World Senior Games
 2015 Huntsman World Senior Games
 2016 Huntsman World Senior Games - 30th / 34 countries / oldest athlete, Daniel Bulkley, who’s 99 / about 11,000 athletes / 29 Sports 
 2017 Huntsman World Senior Games
 2018 Huntsman World Senior Games
 2019 Huntsman World Senior Games
 2020 Huntsman World Senior Games - Cancelled 
 2021 Huntsman World Senior Games
 2022 Huntsman World Senior Games

Results
https://seniorgames.net/results

https://seniorgames.net/results/2015/archery-3d/all

Community Impact
The World Senior Games annually brings in an estimated $17 million in direct economic impact to the St. George community.

Brigham Young University students have provided free health screenings, conducted research at the games and published findings in peer-reviewed journals, and are a major source of volunteers at the competition.

Events
For 2021, competition is available in 34 different sports.

Archery - 3D
Archery - Target
Badminton
Basketball
Bocce
Bowling
Cowboy Action Shooting
Cycling
Golf
Horseshoes
Lawn Bowls
Mountain Biking
Pickleball
Power Walking
Race Walking
Racquetball
Road Races
Rowing - Indoor
Rugby
Shooting Benchrest
Shooting Handgun
Shotgun Sports
Shuffleboard
Soccer
Softball
Square Dance
Swimming
Table Tennis
Tennis
Track & Field
Trail Running
Triathlon
Volleyball
Walking Tours

See also
 Senior Olympics
 Senior sport
 Masters athletics (track and field)

References

External links

Fittest 50 Over 50
Active Life podcast

Senior Olympics
Senior sports competitions
Multi-sport events in the United States
Recurring sporting events established in 1987
Sports competitions in Utah